Narain Singh may refer to:
Narayan Singh Burdak
Narain Singh (politician)